Pomacentrus coelestis, the neon damselfish, is a species of damselfish in the family Pomacentridae. It is found in the Indo-Pacific. It occasionally makes its way into the aquarium trade.

Distribution and habitat
This fish is found in the Indo-Pacific. In the Indian Ocean, they are found in Sri Lanka, the Andaman Sea, Indonesia, and Australia. In the Pacific Ocean, they are found in Indonesia, Australia, the Philippines, Vietnam, Taiwan, Japan, and Pacific islands all the way to Hawaii. Adults are found in coral reefs and lagoons.

Description
They have 13 dorsal spines, 13 to 15 dorsal soft rays, 2 anal spines, and 14 to 15 anal soft rays. This fish is blue.

Ecology

Diet
This fish feeds on zooplankton and benthic algae.

Behavior
Juveniles school above soft corals while adults are found in small of large aggregations over their favorite parts of the reef.

References

External links
 

coelestis
Fish described in 1901
Taxa named by David Starr Jordan